Solomon ben Samson was a scholar of Worms in the eleventh century.

He was a teacher and relative of Rashi, who refers to him as an authority beside his other teacher, Isaac ha-Levi. Most probably he is identical with the Solomon ben Samson mentioned as a native of Vitry, this name being apparently an error for Lorraine, among whose scholars he is cited.

Notes

References
 Henri Gross, Gallia Judaica, pp. 217, 295 (online)
 Leopold Zunz, Literaturgeschichte p. 157 (online)
 Zunz, Zur Geschichte und Literatur p. 192 (online)

11th-century scholars
11th-century German writers
11th-century German Jews
Medieval Jewish scholars